Sehnsucht ("Desire" or "Longing") is the second studio album by German Neue Deutsche Härte band Rammstein. It was released on 22 August 1997 through Motor Music in Europe and Slash Records in the United States. It is the only album entirely in German to be certified platinum by the RIAA in the US. The album peaked at No. 1 on the Austrian and German charts.

In 2020, Metal Hammer included it in their list of top 10 1997 albums.

Cover art
The album booklet folds out to reveal six different covers, one for each band member (each photo depicting the member with vintage medical / surgical instruments). The cover most commonly seen shows Till Lindemann with a surgical metal wire utensil worn as a muzzle and surgical forks over his eyes. The cover art was created by Austrian artist Gottfried Helnwein, who also created the cover for the Scorpions' Blackout album, which  the Sehnsucht cover resembles.

Track listing

Additional notes

Special editions
Multiple special editions of Sehnsucht were released, offering different bonus tracks:
The following songs as tracks 12 and 13 for the North American and Japanese releases:
"Engel (English Version)"
"Du hast (English Version)"
These songs are also included on micro-cassettes, and may be hidden tracks on certain editions.
"Du riechst so gut '98" as track 12. A version also includes the video for "Du riechst so gut '98".
A limited edition release in Europe features 14 tracks:
"Rammstein (Eskimos & Egypt Radio Edit)"
"Du riechst so gut '98"
"Du hast (Remix by Clawfinger)"
"Stripped" as a twelfth track, which may be included on the micro-cassette version and/or be included as a hidden track.
"Stripped" as a twelfth track and the "Asche zu Asche" single as a second CD. The "Asche zu Asche" single may be included on the first CD to make a total of 18 tracks.
A 2001 Australian Tour Edition, which had "Stripped" as a twelfth track, and a second CD with the "Asche zu Asche" single as the first track, followed by five live songs.

Personnel

Rammstein
Till Lindemann – lead vocals
Richard Kruspe – lead guitar, backing vocals
Paul Landers – rhythm guitar, backing vocals
Oliver Riedel – bass, backing vocals (track 1)
Christian "Flake" Lorenz – keyboards
Christoph Schneider – drums

Guest vocals
Bobo – vocals in "Engel"

Production
Björn Engelmann – mastering 
Emanuel Fialik – management
Jacob Hellner – producer
Gottfried Helnwein – photography, portrait photography
Ronald Prent – mixing
Dirk Rudolph – cover design, sleeve design
Mark Stagg – programming

Charts

Weekly charts

Year-end charts

Certifications

References 

1997 albums
Rammstein albums
German-language albums
Slash Records albums